William Howard Humphries (19 May 1891 – 1954) was an English footballer who played in the Football League for Aston Villa and Rotherham County. He was born in Aston. He also was a wartime guest player for Stoke, playing six times in 1916–17.

Career statistics
Source:

References

1891 births
1954 deaths
Footballers from Birmingham, West Midlands
English footballers
Association football forwards
Association football fullbacks
Aston Villa F.C. players
Southend United F.C. players
Rotherham County F.C. players
English Football League players
Stoke City F.C. wartime guest players
Date of death missing
Place of death missing